It is estimated that 290 million tonnes of waste was produced in the United Kingdom in 2008 but volumes are declining. In 2012 municipal solid waste generation was almost 30 million tonnes, according to Waste Atlas Platform.

The National Waste Strategy is a policy of the government, and in particular the Department for Environment, Food and Rural Affairs (Defra), intended to foster a move to sustainability in waste management within

Food waste

Since 1915, food waste has been identified as a considerable problem and has been the subject of ongoing media attention, intensifying with the launch of the  "Love Food, Hate Waste" campaign in 2007. Food waste has been discussed in newspaper articles, news reports and television programmes, which have increased awareness of it as a public issue. To tackle waste issues, encompassing food waste, the government-funded "Waste & Resources Action Programme" (WRAP) was created in 2000.

The main and most common method of disposal in the United Kingdom is landfill. Other methods are also used such as Incineration and anaerobic digestion. Out of all of the waste that was from household, commercial and industrial waste, approximately 57% of the waste was disposed in landfill sites. In addition some waste from sewage sludge, mining waste, and quarrying waste are moved to landfill sites. Landfill has been the most efficient way of disposal in the UK, as of in 1994 there were approximately 4000 landfill sites.

Other types of waste

Household waste

Throughout the country, the average person generates a little over one thousand pounds of waste per year.  This average varies city to city-ranging from seven hundred to slightly over thirteen hundred pounds per person a year.

Fly tipping

This is the illegal dumping of waste, most commonly found among roadways or abandon areas,  which has been increasing and becoming a problem within parts of the UK.  Household items are the most commonly found items among incidents.  In 2016 there was around one million fly tipping incidents which was more than a 5% increase from the previous year.  Majority of the culprits are individuals who are unwilling to pay or allocate the time to properly dispose of their waste.  The most common size load was equivalent to the size of a small work van.  These incidents threaten human health as it pollutes the air and harms the environment significantly.  It was estimated that the cost of clearance of this waste by officials was over sixty million dollars.  Penalties and regulations have become significantly more harsh in order to deal with this issue.

Hazardous waste

This waste is produced mainly from mining and minerals as well as any other unaffiliated oil or oily water.  This includes substances such as asbestos, solvents, pesticides, oils etc.  They account for the lowest percentage of waste accumulated in the UK, however can be the most harmful if not properly treated and managed.

Landfills
Landfills in the United Kingdom are historically very important resources for waste disposal. As it was so important it has become excessively used to the point where some landfills are at capacity. This is because before the 1980s the UK government previously used the “dilute and disperse” method of waste. The UK is now looking for options to reduce the levels of their landfill sites through legislation.   This is a United Kingdom national strategy of which member states set up methods to target biodegradable materials in landfills. These methods include and are mainly composed of recycling, composting, and biogas production.

Waste to energy

There are a number of Waste-to-energy power plants in the UK especially in England. Notable plants include:
England
Allington Quarry Waste Management Facility
Belvedere Incinerator
Derwenthaugh Coke Works
Glanford Power Station
Kirklees Incinerator
Newburn Steelworks
Newhaven Incinerator
Ottovale coke works
Stoke Incinerator
Teesside EfW plant
Tyseley Energy from Waste Plant
Whinfield Power Station
Isle of Man
Isle of Man Incinerator
Isle of Wight
Isle of Wight gasification facility
Scotland
Longannet power station, Scotland

Waste by country

England

Scotland
In Scotland in 1993, 14 million tons of waste was produced. 100,000 tons was toxic waste and 260,000 tons was controlled waste from other parts of Britain and abroad. 45% of the special waste was in liquid form and 18% was asbestos - radioactive waste was not included. Of the controlled waste, 48% came from the demolition of buildings, 22% from industry, 17% from households and 13% from business - only 3% were recycled. Ninety percent of controlled waste was buried in landfill sites and produced 2 million tons of methane gas. 1.5% was burned in incinerators and 1.5% were exported to be disposed of or recycled. There are 900 disposal sites in Scotland.

There are very few vacant or derelict land sites in the north east of Scotland, as there are few traditional heavy industries or coal/mineral extraction sites. However some areas are contaminated by aromatic hydrocarbons (500.25 cubic meters).

Wales

Notable waste issues
The Bawtry gasworks contamination involved the contamination of land at Bawtry, South Yorkshire, England with hazardous by-products from the manufacture of coal gas.
The Spodden Valley asbestos controversy arose in May 2004 when approximately 72 acres (290,000 m2) of land in Spodden Valley in Rochdale, England, formerly used by Turner Brothers Asbestos Company (later known as Turner & Newall), and the site of the world's largest asbestos textile factory, was sold to MMC Estates, a property developer.

See also
Don't let Devon go to waste
List of incinerators in the United Kingdom
New Technologies Demonstrator Programme
Waste by country
Clearabee
International Waste#United Kingdom

References

External links

Waste and recycling at Defra